Siti Adira binti Suhaimi (born 19 September 1991) is a Malaysian singer. She is the runner-up of the eighth season of Astro's television reality program, Akademi Fantasia. She also known as Queen of Soundtrack.

Akademi Fantasia
At age 19, she auditioned for the Astro reality show, Akademi Fantasia, along with her sister, Ema. They managed to enter the show, becoming the first pair of siblings to enter Astro. However, on the second week, her sister was eliminated. She managed to remain in the show, throughout ten weeks, and in the finale, she resulted as a runner-up with 25.13% votes.

In the show's 8th season, Adira was the student that was never on the bottom two.

Song performances on Akademi Fantasia

Post AF: Career

2010–present: Ku Ada Kamu
Adira's coronation song "Ku Ada Kamu" was released as a promotional single via the compilation album "Hitz AF8", featuring songs by the contestants of Akademi Fantasia 8. The song was a massive hit in Malaysia, topping several radio charts, such as Carta Hot FM 30, Carta Muzik Muzik and Carta Suria FM. It became a top 5 hit in Carta Muzik FM and Carta Era, at No.2 and No.5. A music video of the song was released about a few days after the finale concert of the eight season of Akademi Fantasia.

In December 2010, the song was announced as one of the songs that managed to enter the Anugerah Juara Lagu, a Malaysian annual award show to honour the best songs in the local entertainment industry. She performed the song on the award show, held on Stadium Bukit Jalil, Kuala Lumpur on 9 January 2011.

Following her success after Akademi Fantasia, Adira became the spokesperson for Innershine Pati Prun along with her sister, Ema. She made her acting debut in Lawaknya Fantasia Raya, a comedy television movie starring alongside Rozita Che Wan and Dato' Aziz Sattar.

In the same year, she sang the theme song of Astro Citra's "Dendam Kesuma", "Kesuma" and "Ilusi" which served as the theme song of the comedy series Awan Dania, in the third season, which is also Adira's favourite TV series. She also voiced the Malaysian versions of Spider-Man and The Adventures of Sharkboy and Lavagirl, as Mary Jane and Lavagirl, respectively.

Filmography

Film

Television

Discography

Studio albums

1. Dewi Cinta (2013)

Singles

Original Soundtrack (OST)
Her best achievement so far is as Singer of Malaysian film, drama or TV programs Soundtracks.

Awards and nominations

Anugerah Industri Muzik

Anugerah Juara Lagu

Anugerah Planet Muzik

Akademi Fantasia

Anugerah Bintang Popular Berita Harian

Festival Filem Malaysia

Anugerah Skrin

Other Awards

References

External links

1991 births
Living people
People from Sabah
Kadazan-Dusun people
Malaysian Muslims
21st-century Malaysian women singers
Malaysian television personalities
Malaysian film actresses
Malaysian voice actresses
Malay-language singers
Malaysian television actresses
21st-century Malaysian actresses
Akademi Fantasia participants